Zurab Dzneladze is a Georgian rugby union player. He plays as Wing for Locomotive Tbilisi in the Georgia Championship and Georgia national rugby union team.

References

1992 births
Living people
Rugby union players from Georgia (country)
Georgia international rugby union players
Rugby union fullbacks